The Care Bears Battle the Freeze Machine is the second animated television special to feature the Care Bears characters.  Made by Ottawa's Atkinson Film-Arts studios, it premiered in syndication in April 1984. The special introduces three new Care Bears characters,Grams Bear, Hugs, and Tugs.

Plot
Paul, a young boy, vows to get even with his bullies. Through this, the mad scientist Professor Coldheart tricks him into fixing his "Careless Ray Contraption" after his bumbling henchman Frostbite breaks it by accident. The Care Bears, led by Tenderheart Bear, must do all that they can to stop Coldheart's plan of freezing every child in town with his machine. Hugs and Tugs, two baby Care Bears are kidnapped by Coldheart to be trapped in ice, and after finding it out from their caretaker Grams Bear, the Care Bears must not only stop Coldheart and convince Paul not to get even, but must also rescue Hugs and Tugs.

Overview
The special, a follow-up to the previous instalment The Land Without Feelings (from 1983), sees the return of the ten original Bears and the rarely seen Cloud Keeper, as well as the blue-skinned love-hating villain Professor Coldheart. In addition, the special introduces Baby Hugs, Baby Tugs, their caretaker Grams Bear, and Professor Coldheart's dwarf henchman, Frostbite.

Cast
Les Lye as Professor Coldheart
Anna MacCormack
Noreen Young as Baby Hugs
Abby Hagyard as Friend Bear, Wish Bear & Love-A-Lot Bear
Bob Dermer as Frostbite and the Cloudkeeper
Dominic Bradford as Paul
Brodie Osome as Lumpy
Rick Jones as Tenderheart Bear, Birthday Bear & Good Luck Bear

Release and reception
The Care Bears Battle the Freeze Machine aired on over 100 U.S. TV stations in April 1984, and was sponsored by the Kenner company.  That same year, it won an award for Best Children's Program at the 13th National ACTRA Awards.  A tie-in book based on the special was written by Arthur S. Rosenblatt, illustrated by Joe Ewers and published by Parker Brothers as a part of the Tales from the Care Bears series.

The special was released on VHS and Beta by Family Home Entertainment in May 1984.  This, and The Land Without Feelings, were among the ten best-selling children's videos on the U.S. market in 1985.  It was released for the first time on DVD, as a special feature, on MGM Home Entertainment's 2007 re-issue of The Care Bears Movie.  The print featured on the disc is the syndicated edit, not the original broadcast version.

In 1987, Don R. Le Duc referred to Freeze Machine as a "shallow merchandising marvel".

References

External links

1980s animated television specials
1980s musical films
1984 television films
1984 television specials
1984 films
Canadian television specials
Care Bears films
Musical television specials
Films directed by Pino van Lamsweerde